Nagore Calderón Rodríguez (born 2 June 1993) is a Spanish football midfielder who plays for Primera División club Sevilla. She was a member of the Spain national team between 2012 and 2015.

Career
Calderón started to play football in Atlético Concilio and when she was 12 years old she went to Atlético Madrid. In 2016, she moved to Levante UD then one year later, to newly-promoted Sevilla FC.

International career
In October 2012 she made her debut for the Spain women's national football team in the second leg of the 2013 European Championship's repêchage, which marked Spain's second qualification for the championship, sixteen years after their first. As a junior international she won the 2010 U-17 European Championship and a bronze in the 2010 U-17 World Cup.

In June 2013, national team coach Ignacio Quereda called Calderón up to his 23-player squad for the UEFA Women's Euro 2013 finals in Sweden.

References

External links
 
 
Profile at Txapeldunak.com 

1993 births
Living people
Spanish women's footballers
Spain women's international footballers
Footballers from the Community of Madrid
Primera División (women) players
Atlético Madrid Femenino players
Levante UD Femenino players
Women's association football midfielders
Sevilla FC (women) players
Spain women's youth international footballers
21st-century Spanish women